Drape can refer to:

a curtain
Drapery, cloth used for decorative purposes
Drape suit, a British variation of the lounge suit